L.A. Run is a song written by Alan Carvell and Brian O Shea, and recorded by the Carvells in 1977 which reached number 31 in the UK charts in November of the same year. The song is about the then-new craze of Skateboarding which had crossed-over from the US to the UK that same year.

With new lyrics in Swedish by T. B. Håkanson and S. Schröder I as Skateboard, Magnum Bonum scored a 1978 success with the song.

Charts

Carvell's version

Magnum Bonum version

References

1977 songs
Number-one singles in Sweden